The Freediver is a 2004 British drama film written and directed by Alki David.

Cast 
 Alki David - Hector
 Adam Baldwin - Dr. Viades
 Camilla Rutherford - Danai
 Dominique Swain - Maggie
 Judd Nelson - Ziad
 James Fox - Sebastian Nagel

References

External links 

2004 drama films
2004 films
American drama films
2000s English-language films
2000s American films